Tingena decora is a species of moth in the family Oecophoridae. It is endemic to New Zealand and has been collected at Lake Rotoroa and adults are on the wing in February.

Taxonomy
This species was first described by Alfred Philpott in 1928 using specimens collected at Lake Rotoroa, near Nelson in February and named Borkhausenia decora. In 1939 George Hudson discussed and illustrated this species under the name B. decora. In 1988 J. S. Dugdale placed this species within the genus Tingena. The male holotype is held in the New Zealand Arthropod Collection.

Description 

Philpott described this species as follows:
This species is very similar in appearance to T. compsogramma but T. docora is a more rich and darkly coloured moth.

Distribution
This species is endemic to New Zealand and has been collected at Lake Rotoroa.

Behaviour 
This species is on the wing in February.

References

Oecophoridae
Moths of New Zealand
Moths described in 1928
Endemic fauna of New Zealand
Taxa named by Alfred Philpott
Endemic moths of New Zealand